The Northern Busway is a bus-only road running north from the Brisbane central business district to the Royal Brisbane & Women's Hospital in Queensland, Australia. The first section of the busway opened on 23 February 2004 with one station at QUT Kelvin Grove. In December 2005, Normanby and Herston stations opened.

The Northern Busway extension opened in stages with the Herston to Windsor section opening in August 2009, and the Windsor to Kedron section opening in June 2012.

History

The first section of the Northern Busway, from the intersection of Roma Street to Herston, opened on 23 February 2004 with only one station, QUT Kelvin Grove. On 14 December 2005, two new stations, Normanby and Royal Children's Hospital Herston, were opened on the existing section.

The second section of the Northern Busway, also known as the Inner Northern Busway, officially opened on 19 May 2008. This section connects the first section of the Northern Busway to the South East Busway with stations at King George Square and Roma Street. To make room for the Inner Northern Busway, the lower floors of King George Square carpark were removed, and one rail platform at Roma Street railway station was removed.

In October 2007, an alliance of Abigroup and SMEC Holdings were selected to build the 1.2 kilometre Royal Children's Hospital to Windsor section with a new station at Royal Brisbane & Women's Hospital. This opened on 3 August 2009. On 18 June 2012, the Windsor to Kedron section opened.

Route

King George Square to Royal Brisbane & Women's Hospital

The Northern Busway starts in a tunnel underneath Albert Street in the Brisbane central business district adjacent to the Queen Street bus station, previously the terminus of the South East Busway. Many northbound services using the Northern Busway originate at the Cultural Centre busway station on the South East Busway. It then proceeds north-west to the King George Square busway station, a large interchange with several stops on each of its two underground platforms. It then surfaces near Roma Street railway station and follows the alignment of the main city train lines. Roma Street busway station is adjacent to the train platforms and is on the same level. Platform 2 is shared by both trains and buses, although the only train to currently use Platform 2 is NSW TrainLink's daily XPT service to Sydney.

The busway then continues north alongside the Exhibition railway line and then north-east through the Victoria Park Golf Complex, with stations adjacent to the Normanby Fiveways, the Queensland University of Technology campus at Kelvin Grove and the Royal Children's Hospital. The busway then turns left and on to a bridge structure alongside the Royal Brisbane and Women's Hospital precinct over Butterfield Street.

Windsor to Kedron
The three kilometre Windsor to Kedron section was built by a John Holland/Thiess consortium opening on 18 June 2012. The route rejoins Lutwyche Road after crossing Enoggera Creek. The route travels via bus lanes and local bus stops until it reaches Truro Street, where it enters into a dedicated 1.5 kilometre underground busway tunnel. After passing through Lutwyche and Kedron Brook busway stations and crossing Kedron Brook, the route rejoins Lutwyche Road at Stafford Road (southbound/inbound) and Sadlier Street (northbound/outbound).

Future extension
The final stage of the busway is planned to be built from Kedron to Bracken Ridge. A series of draft alignments in order to identify the corridor for preservation have been released, however no final route has been selected.

A past state government (the Newman Government) had indicated an intention to revisit the alignment for this project. Their primary points of departure from the policy of the previous government were a preference not to build the full busway option, nor to take the busway all the way to The Prince Charles Hospital. These changes were predicated on the perceived high expense of the previously published preferred options. The current government's stated preference now is for bus or transit lane level priority along the highly congested Gympie Road corridor.

Services
All services on the busway are operated by Brisbane Transport.

References

External links

Bus rapid transit in Australia
Busways
Public transport in Brisbane
Transport infrastructure completed in 2004
2004 establishments in Australia